is a former Japanese football player.

Playing career
Domori was born in Osaka Prefecture on June 29, 1976. He joined newly was promoted to J1 League club, Cerezo Osaka from youth team in 1995. He played many matches as midfielder from 1997. However he could hardly play in the match in 1999. In 2000, he moved to J2 League club Albirex Niigata. In 2001, he moved to Japan Football League (JFL) club Jatco TT (later Jatco). However the club was disbanded end of 2003 season and he moved to JFL club Sagawa Express Osaka. He retired in September 2005.

Club statistics

References

External links

1976 births
Living people
Association football people from Osaka Prefecture
Japanese footballers
J1 League players
J2 League players
Japan Football League players
Cerezo Osaka players
Albirex Niigata players
Jatco SC players
Sagawa Shiga FC players
Association football midfielders